Knocking at Your Back Door: The Best of Deep Purple in the 80's is a compilation album by the British hard rock band Deep Purple. The album was released in 1992.

It is a compilation of tracks from three albums, Perfect Strangers (1984), The House of Blue Light (1987), and the live album Nobody's Perfect (1988).

Track listing
All songs written by Ian Gillan, Ritchie Blackmore, Roger Glover, Jon Lord and Ian Paice, except where noted. "Son of Aleric" is replaced by a live version of "Child in Time" on the PolyGram US edition.

"Knocking at Your Back Door" – 7:02
"Bad Attitude" (Gillan, Blackmore, Glover, Lord) – 5:07
"Son of Alerik" – 10:02
"Nobody's Home" – 4:00
"Black Night" (Live) – 6:07
"Perfect Strangers" – 5:19
"The Unwritten Law" (Gillan, Blackmore, Glover, Paice) – 4:55
"Call of the Wild" (Gillan, Blackmore, Glover, Lord) – 4:51
"Hush" (Live) (Joe South) – 3:31
"Smoke on the Water" (Live) – 7:43
"Space Truckin'" (Live) – 5:39

Personnel
Ian Gillan – vocals
Ritchie Blackmore – guitar
Jon Lord – organ, keyboards
Roger Glover – bass, synthesizer
Ian Paice – drums

References

1992 compilation albums
Deep Purple compilation albums
Mercury Records compilation albums